Zombie Wranglers is a downloadable action game, developed by Frozen Codebase and published by Activision for the Xbox Live Arcade. It was released on May 6, 2009.

Reception

Zombie Wranglers received "generally unfavorable reviews" according to the review aggregation website Metacritic.

References

External links
 

2009 video games
Action video games
Activision games
Cooperative video games
Frozen Codebase games
Multiplayer and single-player video games
Video games about zombies
Video games developed in the United States
Video games featuring black protagonists
Video games featuring female protagonists
Video games with cel-shaded animation
Xbox 360 games
Xbox 360-only games
Xbox 360 Live Arcade games